The Barrett ministry was the combined Cabinet (formally the Executive Council of British Columbia) that governed British Columbia from September 15, 1972, to December 22, 1975. It was led by Dave Barrett, the 26th premier of British Columbia, and consisted of members of the New Democratic Party.

The Bill Bennett ministry was established after the 1972 British Columbia general election when long-time premier W.A.C. Bennett was defeated in the general election and Dave Barrett was elected as his successor. The cabinet governed through the 30th Parliament of British Columbia, until the New Democratic Party was defeated in the 1975 British Columbia general election. It was succeeded by the Bill Bennett ministry.

List of ministers

References

Sources 

Politics of British Columbia
Executive Council of British Columbia
1972 establishments in British Columbia
Cabinets established in 1972
1975 disestablishments in British Columbia
Cabinets disestablished in 1975